Guran (also Romanized as Gūrān) is a village in Aq Bolagh Rural District, Sojas Rud District, Khodabandeh County, Zanjan Province, Iran. At the 2006 census, its population was 375, in 68 families.

References 

Populated places in Khodabandeh County